The Knoxville Impact was a soccer club based in Knoxville, Tennessee that competed in the USISL.

Year-by-year

External links
 Additional information on this soccer club can be found at https://web.archive.org/web/20060820181356/http://www.impactusanike.com/Default.aspx

Defunct soccer clubs in Tennessee
1992 establishments in Tennessee
1996 disestablishments in Tennessee
Association football clubs established in 1992
Association football clubs disestablished in 1996